Vasile Simionaș (born 16 November 1950) is a former Romanian professional football manager and football player. He usually played as a midfielder.

Club career
In April 1968, at the age of seventeen, Simionaș made his Divizia A debut  for Dinamo Bacău by coming in for the last 20 minutes in a match against Progresul București. A year later he moved to Politehnica Iași.

Simionaș is widely considered to be the most important player in the history of Politehnica Iași, having amassed 359 Divizia A games for them over a fifteen-year period. He was part of the golden team of Politehnica and together with Mihai Romilă and Gabriel Simionov made one of the memorable midfield lines of the Romanian league.

Managerial career
After retiring, Simionaș started his football manager career and made a name for himself with Oțelul Galați in the nineties, where he became one of the most important managers in the club's history. After 2005, Simionaș started to work as an observer for the Romanian Football Federation and also managed CSM Pașcani for a short period in 2013.

Honours
Politehnica Iași
Divizia B: 1972–73, 1981–82

Notes

References

External links
 Vasile Simionaș at labtof.ro
 

1950 births
Living people
Sportspeople from Iași
Romanian footballers
Association football midfielders
Romania youth international footballers
Romania under-21 international footballers
Olympic footballers of Romania
Romania international footballers
Liga I players
Liga II players
FCM Bacău players
FC Politehnica Iași (1945) players
Romanian football managers
FCV Farul Constanța managers
AFC Dacia Unirea Brăila managers
FC Progresul București managers
ASC Oțelul Galați managers
FC Astra Giurgiu managers